Jay Nixon State Park is a state park in Reynolds County, Missouri, that was announced by the Missouri Department of Natural Resources in January 2017.  The park is named for governor Jay Nixon under whom several new Missouri state parks were added.

At the time of the park's announcement there were no facilities in the park, and it could only be accessed via the Ozark Trail. After initially announcing the park open, though largely inaccessible, the park's website was updated to say that , it is closed with no access.

The name of the new park has been controversial, and on January 12, 2017, Missouri state senator Gary Romine and state representative Paul Fitzwater filed bills in their respective chambers to rename the park Proffitt Mountain State Park.

References

External links

Jay Nixon State Park Missouri Department of Natural Resources
Jay Nixon State Park Information Meeting Missouri Department of Natural Resources

Protected areas of Reynolds County, Missouri
State parks of Missouri
Protected areas established in 2017
2017 establishments in Missouri